Armin Mahbanoozadeh (born August 15, 1991) is an Iranian American former competitive figure skater. He is the 2010 Skate America bronze medalist and the 2012 U.S. national pewter medalist. He is also a two-time ISU Junior Grand Prix Final medalist (2008 silver, 2007 bronze) and the 2007 U.S. novice champion.

Personal life 
Armin Mahbanoozadeh was born on August 15, 1991, in Alexandria, Virginia. He is a classically trained pianist. His surname means "born from a lady as beautiful as the moon" in Persian. Mahbanoozadeh graduated from Langley High School in 2009 and was accepted to Dartmouth College but ultimately gave up his spot due to his training. He studied at the University of Pennsylvania until his move to Colorado Springs, Colorado. In June 2013, he was re-accepted into Dartmouth.

Career 
Mahbanoozadeh won the bronze at the 2007–08 Junior Grand Prix Final and silver at the 2008–09 Final.

Mahbanoozadeh made his senior Grand Prix debut during the 2007–08 season. He finished 9th at 2009 Skate Canada and 11th at 2009 Cup of China. At his first senior U.S. Nationals, he finished 8th.

During the 2010–11 season, Mahbanoozadeh placed 4th at 2010 Nebelhorn Trophy and received one Grand Prix assignment, 2010 Skate America where he won his first medal on the senior circuit. He was fourth after the short program and moved up to claim the bronze, edging out Adam Rippon.

For the 2011–12 season, Mahbanoozadeh began attempting a quad toe loop in competition. He was assigned to Grand Prix events 2011 Skate America and 2011 NHK Trophy, placing 10th and 8th respectively. In December 2011, he moved to Colorado Springs, Colorado, to be coached by Christy Krall, Eddie Shipstad, Catarina Lindgren, and Kathy Casey. Mahbanoozadeh finished 4th at the 2012 U.S. Championships and was awarded the pewter medal. He was named as the second alternate for the 2012 Four Continents behind 13th-place finisher Richard Dornbush, and as a result was not selected when Jeremy Abbott withdrew.

Mahbanoozadeh won the silver medal at the 2012 U.S. International Classic. He replaced the injured Evan Lysacek at the 2012 Skate America.

On June 4, 2013, Mahbanoozadeh said he would not compete the following season.

Programs

Competitive highlights

2007–2013

2001–2007

References

External links 

 
 Armin Mahbanoozadeh at IceNetwork

1991 births
Living people
American male single skaters
American people of Iranian descent
Sportspeople from Alexandria, Virginia
Sportspeople from Fairfax County, Virginia
People from Great Falls, Virginia